{{Infobox character
| name = Lucario
| image = Pokémon Lucario art.png
| alt = A bipedal blue and black jackal with tan fur on its torso. It has a spike on its chest(When hugged will poke through your heart), and on the end of its two arms(Which it uses to fire of steel moves). Similar to Kicks from the animal crossing series.
| caption = National Pokédex Riolu - Lucario (#448) - Hippopotas
| series = Pokémon series
| first_major = Pokémon: Lucario and the Mystery of Mew
| first_date = July 16, 2005
| firstgame = Pokémon Diamond and Pearl (2006)
| designer = Ken Sugimori
| voice = EnglishSean Schemmel (movie, SSB for 3DS/Wii U - Ultimate)Bill Rogers (all other appearances)JapaneseDaisuke Namikawa (all other appearances)Daisuke Sakaguchi (anime, Riley’s/Gen’s and Maylene’s/Sumomo’s)Rikako Aikawa (anime, Cameron's/Kotetsu's)Kiyotaka Furushima (anime, Korrina's/Corni's)
| species = {{Unbulleted list
  | Aura Pokémon
  | 
  | National Pokédex
  | Riolu ← 'Lucario 
  | 
  }}
| gender = ♂ Male / ♀ Female
| title = 
| lbl21 = Type
| data21 =   
| origin = Sinnoh (Generation IV)
}}
 is a Pokémon species in Nintendo and Game Freak's Pokémon franchise. Created by Ken Sugimori, Lucario first appeared as a central character in the film Pokémon: Lucario and the Mystery of Mew, then a cameo in Pokémon Mystery Dungeon: Blue Rescue Team and Red Rescue Team, and later appeared in the video games Pokémon Diamond and Pearl and subsequent sequels, also appearing in various merchandise, spin-off titles and animated and printed adaptations of the franchise. Lucario is voiced by Daisuke Namikawa, Daisuke Sakaguchi, Rikako Aikawa and Kiyotaka Furushima in Japanese, and Bill Rogers and Sean Schemmel in English.

Known as the Aura Pokémon, Lucario can sense and manipulate , a special kind of energy emitted by Ash in the anime, and some special Lucario users who have a special and strong bond with their Lucario creatures. Since its debut, Lucario has received critical acclaim, and has been featured in several forms of merchandise, including figurines, plush toys, and the Pokémon Trading Card Game. Lucario has also been featured as a playable character in the Super Smash Bros. series since Super Smash Bros. Brawl.

 Concept and creation 

The design and art direction for Lucario was provided by Ken Sugimori, a friend of the creator of the Pokémon games, Satoshi Tajiri. In an interview, Pokémon Diamond and Pearl director Junichi Masuda noted Lucario's name as one of the most difficult to create, due to an effort to make it appealing to both Japanese and American audiences.

Lucario is a canid-like Pokémon partly based on Anubis, the jackalheaded god of death from Egyptian mythology that is a bipedal digitigrade with finger-like digits on its forepaws. Its chest and the exterior of its wrists each feature a single, white spike. It also has a large snout and ears, red irises with vertical slit pupils, an "hourglass"-shaped figure with leering thighs significantly thicker than the rest of its body, iron rings incorporated into its shoulders and waist, and a raccoon's "mask" that loosely resembles a khakkhara with four small dreadlock-like appendages on the back of its head that are used to sense Aura. The coloration of Lucario's fur is predominantly blue and black, although its torso features buff-colored fur slightly shaggier than the rest of its body. When it opens its mouth wide enough, sharp fangs can be seen.

 Appearances 

 In the video games 
Lucario's debut and video game appearance is in Pokémon Mystery Dungeon: Blue Rescue Team and Red Rescue Team, though it only appears as a Statue Cameo when the player gets 15,000 points and the Lucario rank (the highest rank in the game). It then appeared in Pokémon Diamond and Pearl, where its pre-evolved form, Riolu, can be obtained as an egg from Riley. Riolu evolves into Lucario when it reaches a sufficiently high level of happiness. Lucario is used by notable trainers Maylene, the third Sinnoh Gym Leader; a tag team partner known as Riley; Cynthia, Sinnoh's Elite Four Champion; and by Bruno, an Elite Four member of Johto. In Pokémon Mystery Dungeon Lucario is perceived as the greatest rescue leader of all time, and his adventures have become legendary. After reaching a certain number of points, a Lucario statue will be displayed outside the rescue base. While the player never meets Lucario, Alakazam tells the player that his goal is to become closer to Lucario's greatness. Lucario can be found and befriended in Lost Wilderness dungeon in Pokémon Mystery Dungeon Explorers of Time and Darkness, but it has no particular main role. However, in Pokémon Mystery Dungeon Explorers of Sky and Pokémon Super Mystery Dungeon, its pre-evolution form Riolu may be played as the main character or be chosen as the partner Pokémon. Lucario appears as a boss Pokémon in Pokémon Ranger: Shadows of Almia, as the guardian of the Blue Gem. Lucario is one of the few Pokémon in Pokémon X and Y that can use the new Mega Evolution mechanic. While holding Lucarionite, its Mega Stone, it can Mega Evolve into Mega Lucario during battle. Lucario also appears as an NPC in PokéPark Wii: Pikachu's Adventure and its sequel, PokéPark 2: Wonders Beyond.

Due to an unintentional leak on Nintendo's official Super Smash Bros. website, which detailed how certain stickers could only be applied to certain characters, Lucario was indirectly confirmed as a playable character for Super Smash Bros. Brawl. In Brawl, Lucario is unlocked upon being encountered in the story mode at The Glacial Peak, or through other special means. Lucario's special moveset consists of Aura Sphere, Force Palm, ExtremeSpeed, and Double Team, each of which it can learn within the Pokémon games. Its "Final Smash", Aura Storm, consists of launching a powerful beam of Aura, which the player can adjust in a slow, fanning motion. Lucario's fighting style revolves around a mixture of martial arts, predominately Shaolin Kung Fu, and Aura manipulation. Aura itself is also a game mechanic unique to Lucario: its attacks become stronger as it continues to receive damage.

Lucario returned as a playable character in Super Smash Bros. for Nintendo 3DS and Wii U and again in Super Smash Bros. Ultimate, now being voiced by Sean Schemmel as in Pokémon: Lucario and the Mystery of Mew. Additionally, its Aura mechanic now affects the entirety of its moveset and has made Lucario's attacks riskier, yet more rewarding, due to the mechanic's damage multipliers being adjusted. In Super Smash Bros. for Nintendo 3DS and Wii U, Lucario's Mega Evolution, Mega Lucario, replaced Aura Storm as its Final Smash, reflecting the form change introduced in Pokémon X and Y. In Super Smash Bros. Ultimate, its Final Smash consists of it Mega Evolving into Mega Lucario before performing Aura Storm. In addition to the Super Smash Bros. series, Lucario appears as a playable character in Pokkén Tournament, Pokémon Go, New Pokémon Snap and Pokémon Unite. He also appears as a usable Pokémon in Pokémon Masters as the personal partner of Korrina. In the game, the player gets access to using Korrina as they progress through the story, with her Lucario being able to Mega Evolve. When the 6-Star EX rarity was introduced, Korrina was one of the very first characters to able to be raised to 6-Star EX, which lets her Sync Move target all opponents, and makes her clothes blue to match her Lucario. Then, during the game’s third year anniversary event, Cynthia got a new alt with a Lucario called Sygna Suit Aura Cynthia, who is a Fighting Support Sync Pair that released alongside Sygna Suit Thunderbolt Red’s Pikachu and Ash Ketchum’s Pikachu to introduce the concept of Buddy Moves, which are special moves that only be used when specific things happen in battle. For Cynthia, if her Lucario is hit by three attacks, she can use B Aura Sphere, which provides plenty of buffs after use. Just like Korrina’s Lucario, Cynthia’s can also Mega Evolve.

 In anime 
Lucario's main role in the anime is his appearance in the eighth Pokémon movie, Pokémon: Lucario and the Mystery of Mew. In the movie, Lucario is a servant to a nobleman named Sir Aaron in a Renaissance-themed city called Cameron Palace. Lucario thinks of Sir Aaron as both his master and close friend, although after Aaron traps him in a magic staff, Lucario begins questioning any Pokémon-human relationship. The Lucario in the movie, voiced in English by Sean Schemmel, can speak human languages with telepathy. Lucario sacrifices himself to save the Tree of Beginning, though the credits showed him with Sir Aaron in the afterlife, where they happily eat a chocolate bar.

Maylene, the third Sinnoh Gym Leader, has a Lucario and it was seen in four different episodes of the Diamond and Pearl: Battle Dimension series. It was first seen battling with Maylene in their training. Lucario uses Aura Sphere to stop the battle of Electabuzz, Piplup, and Pikachu, and is seen battling Paul's Pokémon in a flashback. Lucario was seen again where it battles in Dawn's gym battle with Maylene, where it defeats Dawn's Piplup. Then, in the next episode, it battles in Ash's gym battle against Maylene. It defeats Ash's Staravia and Chimchar, but gets knocked out along with Ash's Buizel, resulting in a tie. Finally, Lucario was seen when it helps Ash and the others defeat Saturn and Team Galactic. A different Lucario appears on Iron Island, owned by a trainer named Riley. Lucario protects Ash from Pokémon on the island that are fighting against each other.

In the Black and White series, during the Unova League, a trainer named Cameron had his Riolu evolve into Lucario and easily pulverized Ash's Snivy and Pikachu winning Cameron the match, despite bringing only five Pokémon into battle (His Riolu turned Lucario being the last member of his team, after Hydreigon, Samurott, Ferrothorn, and Swanna). Cameron did use his Lucario against Virgil only for it to lose to Virgil's Flareon, because of Lucario's weakness to Fire-types and Cameron's poor strategy.

In the XY series, Ash meets Korrina, the Fighting-type Gym Leader, who owns a Lucario capable of Mega-Evolution. However, because Korrina acted arrogant and failed to notice that her Lucario was too obsessed with battle, it goes berserk whenever Lucario goes into its Mega-evolved form. As a result, Korrina and Lucario have to train under Mabel and her Mega-Mawile in order to learn to be in sync with each other through floral designs. Korrina was later successful in calming Lucario's rage; she used it in battle against Ash for the third Kalos Gym badge but lost. In the Journeys series, Korrina used her Mega-Lucario against Ash in the Battle Festival only to again lose to him and his newly obtained Dragonite.

In Sun and Moon series, Professor Kukui/Masked Royal was revealed to own a Lucario to help drive back the three Guzzlord that were attacking Alola, shortly after Ash was crowned Champion of Alola. Kukui later used Lucario in his full exhibition match against Ash only to lose to Ash's Naganadel.

In Pokémon Journeys, Ash was able to obtain a Lucario himself when his Riolu evolved to fight against and defeat Chairman Rose's Ferrothorn and Copperajah. Ash later gets his Keystone from Korrina and heads to Mega Island to obtain a Lucarionite. He was able to succeed in Mega-evolving his Lucario and used it to knock out Bea's Gigantamax Machamp.

 In other media 
In the Pokémon Adventures manga, like in games, it appears under the ownership of Riley who was on a boat heading to the Battle Frontier. Diamond meets Riley at Iron Island, and Byron asks Riley to help Diamond sharpen his Pokémon battle skills before Diamond goes to Lake Verity. In Pokémon Diamond and Pearl Adventure! the main character, Hareta, gains an egg from Riley which hatches into a Riolu; it later evolves into Lucario. Phantom Thief Pokémon 7 is centered on a boy and his Lucario who take back stolen items from thieves. The name Lucario itself appeared also in the Pokémon Mystery Dungeon: Blue Rescue Team and Red Rescue Team saga where, after the end of the main scenario, the player can talk to Alakazam who tells them the story of a Lucario being a legendary Pokémon rescuer.

 Reception 
Since it appeared in the Pokémon series, Lucario has received universal acclaim from critics. Beckett Pokémon Unofficial Collector editor Sean Cooper stated that Lucario had grown popular in recent years due to its starring role in Lucario and the Mystery of Mew and its appearance in Super Smash Bros. Brawl. Kevin Slackie of Paste listed Lucario as the 29th best Pokémon. Official Nintendo Magazine writer Thomas East included it in his list of some of the coolest Pokémon, further stating that it also happens to be one of the very best-looking Pokémon. GamesRadar described it as "the Bruce Lee of Pokémon". IGN readers voted Lucario as the ninth-best Pokémon. Dale Bishir of IGN described Lucario as the most important Pokémon that impacted the franchise's history, and further stated that it rose through popularity to become one of the most beloved Pokémon of all time, who also made it into Super Smash Bros. and was heavily featured in its own movie, Lucario and the Mystery of Mew. Steven Bogos of The Escapist listed Lucario as tenth of their favorite Pokémon, describing it as one of the most recognizable faces of the franchise. International Business Times cited Lucario as an example of best Pokémon design in Generation IV. CJ Andriessen of Destructoid ranked Lucario as 39th at his list on Super Smash Bros. Ultimate characters, stating that "He’s actually my favorite Pokémon to play as in Smash, but compared to the other Pokémon games represented on this list, the Diamond and Pearl duo is probably the least exciting and inventive of the bunch."

UGO described Lucario as "a new breed of Pokémon" citing its "cooler, more dangerous look". IGN called its presence in Super Smash Bros. Brawl "a bit on the head scratching side" in light of more familiar characters in the title, such as Pikachu. On the other hand, another IGN editor stated that it made sense for the franchise to be represented by a Fighting-type Pokémon, since Super Smash Bros. Brawl is a fighting game. Game Informer stated that Lucario earned its spot in Super Smash Bros. from being one of the most popular Pokémon in Diamond and Pearl. In the Pokémon of the Year poll held by The Pokémon Company, Lucario was voted the most popular Pokémon from Diamond and Pearl, receiving 102,259 votes. It was also the second-most popular Pokémon overall. Jeremy Parish of Polygon ranked 73 fighters from Super Smash Bros. Ultimate "from garbage to glorious", listing Lucario as 34th. Gavin Jasper of Den of Geek ranked Lucario as 43rd of Super Smash Bros. Ultimate characters, criticizing the character that it only belongs to a fight.

Merchandise
Lucario has been featured in several forms of merchandise, including figurines, plush toys, and the Pokémon Trading Card Game''. Lucario has also been a part of the third wave of amiibo, with its figure having been released on January 22, 2015, in Japan, and as a Toys "R" Us-exclusive beginning in February 2015 in North America. Nanoblock kits, and gallery figures have been also made.

Lucario Tech 
Lucario tech references the different mechanics and movements Lucario can do in the game of Super Smash Bros Ultimate.

References

External links 

 Lucario on Pokemon.com

Anthropomorphic canids
Fictional characters with extrasensory perception
Fictional martial artists in video games
Pokémon species
Nintendo protagonists
Super Smash Bros. fighters
Telepath characters in video games
Film characters introduced in 2005
Video game characters introduced in 2006
Fictional jackals
Fictional characters with metal abilities
Fictional boxers
Fictional characters who can move at superhuman speeds
Video game characters with superhuman strength